Continuation of the Séminaire Nicolas Bourbaki programme, for the 1960s.

1960/61 series

1961/62

1962–63

1963–64

1964–65

External links
Source list